Nantuxent Creek is a  estuary of Delaware Bay in Cumberland County, New Jersey in the United States.

It rises on the border of Lawrence and Downe Townships, in the marshes to the northwest of Newport, at the convergence of Middle Brook and Pages Run. It forms part of the border between the two townships. As it runs south, then west around Jones Island, it passes the Nantuxent Wildlife Management Area, which lies on the island, and Newport Landing on the other bank. Its named tributaries are all marsh channels which enter it in the vicinity of Jones Island or below.

The creek empties into Nantuxent Cove of Delaware Bay.

Tributaries
 Eagle Island Gut
 Loopers Gut
 Blizzard Neck Gut
 Granddad Gut
 Ponds Creek
 Little Pond Creek
 Nancy Gut
 Hay Gut
 Blackbird Gut

See also
List of rivers of New Jersey

References

Rivers of Cumberland County, New Jersey
Rivers of New Jersey
Tributaries of Delaware Bay